Rika Hiraki and Amy Frazier were the defending champions, but Frazier did not compete this year. Hiraki teamed up with Karina Habšudová, but were defaulted in their first round match.

Ei Iida and Maya Kidowaki won the title by defeating Li Fang and Kyōko Nagatsuka 6–2, 4–6, 6–4 in the final.

Seeds

Draw

Draw

References

External links
 Official results archive (ITF)
 Official results archive (WTA)

Tokyo Doubles